Kronberg im Taunus is a town in the Hochtaunuskreis district, Hesse, Germany.

Kronberg may also refer to:

 Kronberg (Lower Bavaria), a mountain of Bavaria, Germany
 Kronberg (mountain), a mountain of the Swiss Appenzell Alps
 Kronberg (Taunus) station, a railway station in Kronberg im Taunus, Germany
 Kronberg (Taunus) Süd station, a railway station in Kronberg im Taunus, Germany
 Kronberg Academy, a chamber music academy in Kronberg im Taunus, Germany
 Kronberg Castle, a High Middle Ages Rock castle in Kronberg im Taunus, Germany
 Kronberg Park, a park in Milwaukie, Oregon, United States
 Kronberg Railway, connects Langen, Frankfurt am Main and Kronberg im Taunusin, Hesse, Germany

People
 Claes Kronberg (born 1987), Danish footballer
 Eric Kronberg (born 1983), American soccer player
 Jan Kronberg (born 1947), Australian politician
 Johann Schweikhard von Kronberg (1553–1626), Archbishop-Elector of Mainz
 Julius Kronberg (1850–1921) Swedish artist
 Juris Kronbergs (1946–2020), Latvian-Swedish poet and translator
 Kenneth Kronberg (1948–2007), American businessman and long-time member of the LaRouche movement
 Larisa Kronberg (1929–2017), Soviet Russian actress and KGB agent
 Louis Kronberg (1872–1965), American artist
 Ninni Kronberg (1874–1946), Swedish physiologist
 Robert Kronberg (born 1976), Swedish male hurdler

See also
 
 Kornberg (disambiguation)